Upper Tyndrum railway station is one of two railway stations serving the small village of Tyndrum in Scotland. It is on the Fort William route of the scenic West Highland Line, between Crianlarich and Bridge of Orchy, sited  from Craigendoran Junction, near Helensburgh. Services are operated by ScotRail - who manage the station - and Caledonian Sleeper.

History 
Originally named "Tyndrum", this station opened concurrently with the West Highland Railway in 1894, as the second station in the village.

The station name was altered to "Upper Tyndrum" upon the introduction of RETB (see below), to reduce the risk of it being confused with "Tyndrum Lower" in radio communications.

Signalling 
The signal box, which had 15 levers, was situated on the island platform. From its opening in 1894, the West Highland Railway was worked throughout by the electric token system.

The Down loop at Tyndrum Upper was signalled for running in either direction and the signal box was able to 'switch out' when not required.

In August 1985, the method of working between Crianlarich and Rannoch reverted to the electric token block system. The semaphore signals were removed on 22 December 1985 in preparation for the introduction of Radio Electronic Token Block (RETB).

On 29 May of the same year, the RETB spread north to Fort William Junction, resulting in the closure of Upper Tyndrum signal box (amongst others). The RETB is controlled from a purpose-built Signalling Centre at Banavie railway station. Upper Tyndrum station is the boundary between the two signalling interlockings and the areas of control of the two signalmen.

The Train Protection & Warning System was installed in 2003.

Facilities 
The station only has very basic facilities, being a small car park and some bike racks. The station has no step-free access, the only access being from a subway. As there are no facilities to purchase tickets, passengers must buy one in advance, or from the guard on the train.

Passenger volume 

The statistics cover twelve month periods that start in April.

Services
On weekdays and Saturdays, ScotRail operates three services north to Mallaig, and three south to Glasgow Queen Street. Caledonian Sleeper operates one service each way to Fort William and London Euston (the latter does not run on Saturdays). On Sundays, there are two services northbound to Mallaig, two services southbound to Glasgow Queen Street, and one service to London Euston.

References

Bibliography

External links

Video footage of Upper Tyndrum Station

Railway stations in Stirling (council area)
Former North British Railway stations
Railway stations in Great Britain opened in 1894
Railway stations served by ScotRail
Railway stations served by Caledonian Sleeper
James Miller railway stations